The Second East Branch Magalloway River is a  river in northwestern Maine. It is a tributary of the Magalloway River, part of the Androscoggin River watershed.

See also
List of rivers of Maine

References

Maine Streamflow Data from the USGS
Maine Watershed Data From Environmental Protection Agency

Tributaries of the Kennebec River
Rivers of Maine
Rivers of Knox County, Maine